Albatrossia pectoralis, the giant grenadier or giant rattail, is a very large rattail, and the only member of the genus Albatrossia. It is found in the north Pacific from northern Japan to the Okhotsk and Bering Seas, east to the Gulf of Alaska, and south to northern Baja California in Mexico. It is found at depths between 140 and 3,500 m. It can grow up to 2.1 m in length. The giant grenadier has the usual greatly elongated, pointed tail of the rattails.

Ecology
Giant grenadiers are apex predators on the upper continental slopes of the northern Pacific. Their main prey are Octopoteuthis deletron squid and Vampyroteuthis infernalis vampire squid.

Shape
Giant grenadier have two shapes that have been observed to date, and there is a third shape that seems to be a mixture of the two distinct shapes. They are one of the most abundant species in the northern part of Pacific Ocean.

Because of their great abundance, several attempts have been made to develop a fishery for giant grenadier. However, the fish is categorized as “unpalatable” because of its soft texture, high moisture content, and low protein content.

References

External links
 More info about the Giant Grenadier (Wayback Machine archive of site)

Macrouridae
Fish described in 1892
Monotypic ray-finned fish genera
Taxa named by David Starr Jordan